Schofield is a name.

People with the surname
Notable people with the surname include:
 Admiral Schofield (born 1997), American basketball player
 Alice Schofield (1881–1975), British suffragette and politician
 Andrew Schofield (actor) (born 1958), British actor
 Andrew N. Schofield (born 1930), British civil engineer and professor of soil mechanics
 Christopher J. Schofield, English chemist and professor of organic chemistry
 David Schofield (actor) (born 1951), English actor
 David Schofield (footballer) (born 1981), English footballer
 Deborah Schofield, Australian health economist
 Dick Schofield (born 1962), American Major League baseball player
 Don Schofield (born 1935), Australian rugby league footballer
 Ducky Schofield (born 1935), American Major League baseball player
 Elizabeth Schofield (1935–2005), British-American archaeologist
 Frank Schofield (1889–1970), Canadian veterinarian and philanthropist
 Garry Schofield (born 1965), British rugby league footballer
 Harold Schofield (1903–1975), English footballer
 Harry Methuen Schofield (1899–1955), British test pilot
 Harry Norton Schofield (1865–1931), British recipient of the Victoria Cross
 Jack Lund Schofield (1923–2015), American politician
 Jarrad Schofield (born 1975), Australian Rules football player
 Joe Schofield (1871–1929), English footballer
 John Schofield (VC) (1892–1918), British recipient of the Victoria Cross
 John Schofield (1831–1906), U.S. Secretary of War and Commanding General of the United States Army
 Ken Schofield (born 1946), British golf administrator
 Kinsey Lea Schofield (born 1985), American reality television personality and writer
 Leo Schofield (born 1935), Australian restaurant critic and festival director
 Leslie Schofield (born 1938), English actor
 Norman Schofield (born 1944), British-American political scientist
 Paul Schofield (screenwriter) (c. 1895–?), American screenwriter
 Peter Schofield (Australian rules footballer) (born 1932), Australian rules footballer
 Peter Schofield (civil servant) (born 1969), British civil servant
 Peter Schofield (physicist) (1929–2018), British physicist
 Phillip Schofield (born 1962), British television presenter
 Rachel Schofield (born 1976), British journalist and news presenter for BBC News
 Sylvia Schofield (1916–2006), British writer and traveller
 Terry Schofield (born 1948), American basketball player and coach
 Walter Elmer Schofield (1867–1944), American landscape and marine painter
 Wilfred Borden Schofield (1927–2008), Canadian botanist

People with the given name
Notable people with the given name include:
 Schofield Haigh (1871–1921), Yorkshire cricketer known for his deadly bowling on sticky wickets

Fictional characters
Fictional characters called Schofield include:
 Shane Schofield, main character in four books by Australian author Matthew Reilly
 Penrod Schofield, main character in three books by American author Booth Tarkington
 Lance Corporal William "Will" Schofield, main character in the 2019 war film 1917.
 Michael Schofield, main character in the television show Prison Break

See also
 Scofield (disambiguation)
 Scholefield, a surname